Mustafa Abduldzhemil Jemilev, also known widely with his adopted descriptive surname Qırımoğlu "Son of Crimea" (Crimean Tatar Cyrillic: , ; born 13 November 1943, Ay Serez, Crimea), is the former Chairman of the Mejlis of the Crimean Tatar People and a member of the Ukrainian Parliament since 1998. Commissioner of the President of Ukraine for the Affairs of the Crimean Tatar People (2014–2019). He is a member of the Crimean Tatar National Movement and a former Soviet dissident.

Biography

Life in the Soviet Union
Dzhemilev was born on 13 November 1943 in Ay-Serez, Crimea, then Russian SFSR, though at the time under Nazi occupation. He was only six months old when his family, with the rest of the Crimean Tatar population, was deported by Soviet authorities in May 1944, soon after Soviet forces retook the peninsula. He grew up in exile, in the Uzbek SSR.

At the age of 18, Dzhemilev and several of his activist friends established the Union of Young Crimean Tatars. He thus began the arduous and long struggle for the recognition of the rights of Crimean Tatars to return to their homeland. Between 1966 and 1986, Dzhemilev was arrested six times for anti-Soviet activities and served time in Soviet prisons and labor camps and lived under surveillance.  Dzhemilev is also remembered for going on the longest hunger strike in the history of human rights movements. The hunger strike lasted for 303 days, but he survived due to forced feeding.

He was expelled in the second year from the Tashkent engineers of irrigation and reclamation of agriculture "for unworthy behavior", namely the writing of historical work on the history of Turkic culture in the Crimea before the elimination of the Crimean Khanate from "nationalist" positions.

In May 1989, he was elected to head the newly founded Crimean Tatar National Movement. The same year, he returned to Crimea with his family, a move that would be followed by the eventual return of 250,000 Tatars to their homeland.

Ukrainian politics
During the 1998 Ukrainian parliamentary election he was elected into the Ukrainian parliament on the Rukh list; in 2002, 2006 and 2007 he was re-elected as a member of Our Ukraine.

Interior Minister Yuriy Lutsenko stated in October 2009 that a grouping related to Taliban and Al-Qaeda called "At-Takfir val-Hijra" had been preparing an attempt on Dzhemilev's life; two members of the group were arrested.

In early November 2011, Dzhemilev announced his retirement from politics. But during the 2012 parliamentary elections he joined the All-Ukrainian Union "Fatherland" election list and was re-elected to parliament.

In the 2014 Ukrainian parliamentary election, Dzhemilev was re-elected into parliament after being in the top 10 of the electoral list of Petro Poroshenko Bloc.

In the July 2019 Ukrainian parliamentary election Dzhemilev was placed sixth on the party list of European Solidarity. He was reelected to parliament. Dzhemilev is a member of the Committee on Human Rights, Deoccupation and Reintegration of Temporarily Occupied Territories in Donetsk, Luhansk Regions and Autonomous Republic of Crimea, the city of Sevastopol, National Minorities and Interethnic Relations.

He lobbied against official recognition of the Armenian genocide by Ukraine, and has attempted to rationalize and downplay the scale of it.

Crimean crisis
Dzhemilev was in Ankara during the Crimean referendum. After the preliminary results of the referendum were announced, he held a joint press conference with the Turkish foreign minister Ahmet Davutoğlu. Dzhemilev declared that the Mejlis had a stance identical with Turkey in considering the referendum illegal and claimed that the results were manipulated by Russia.

In April 2014, Dzhemilev was handed a document on the Ukrainian border informing him he is banned by federal law from entering Russian territory for five years. The typewritten document was unsigned, with no official heading, and was made public by the Crimean Tatar parliament, the Mejlis. A spokesman for the Russian Federal Migration Service (FMS) said the agency did not have any information on the travel ban.

Russian authorities then issued an arrest warrant for Dzhemilev and placed him on the federal wanted list, allegedly for trying to illegally cross the border when he attempted to return to Crimea.

Awards 

Dzhemilev has been nominated for the Nobel Peace Prize several times, by various NGOs and persons.

In October 1998, the United Nations High Commissioner for Refugees awarded Dzhemilev the Nansen Medal for his outstanding efforts and "his commitment to the right of return of the Crimean Tatars." In an interview Dzhemilev gave shortly after receiving the Nansen Medal, he emphasized that "when violent means are used, innocent people die, and no just cause can justify the taking of innocent lives." The Crimean Tatar National Movement has been marked by persistent reliance on non-violence.

On 14 April 2014, Dzhemilev was awarded the Order of the Republic by Turkish President Abdullah Gül.

On 3 June 2014, Dzhemilev was awarded as the first recipient of the Solidarity Prize, by the Republic of Poland.

Order of Prince Yaroslav the Wise of the V grade (2001, Ukraine)
Order of Prince Yaroslav the Wise of the IV grade (2003, Ukraine)
Order for Merits to Lithuania (2015, Lithuania)
Order of Liberty (2018, Ukraine)
Grand Cross of the Order of Merit of the Republic of Poland (2022)

See also
 Crimea
 Crimean Tatars
 List of Crimean Tatars
 Islam in Ukraine

Notes

References
For more information about Mustafa Dzhemilev and related links to his interviews and writings, see the Web site of the International Committee for Crimea.

Interviews

Further reading

External links

 Mejlis of the Crimean Tatar People
 Crimean Tatar National Movement
 International Committee for Crimea
 RFE/RL Interview with Mustafa Dzhemilev
 Dzhemilev biography

1943 births
People from Sudak
Living people
Ukrainian Muslims
Soviet dissidents
Nonviolence advocates
Soviet democracy activists
People's Movement of Ukraine politicians
Petro Poroshenko Bloc politicians
People of the Euromaidan
Third convocation members of the Verkhovna Rada
Fourth convocation members of the Verkhovna Rada
Fifth convocation members of the Verkhovna Rada
Sixth convocation members of the Verkhovna Rada
Seventh convocation members of the Verkhovna Rada
Eighth convocation members of the Verkhovna Rada
Recipients of the Order of Prince Yaroslav the Wise, 4th class
Recipients of the Order of Prince Yaroslav the Wise, 5th class
Recipients of the Order for Merits to Lithuania
Ukrainian exiles of the annexation of Crimea by the Russian Federation
Crimean Tatar independence activists
Ombudsmen in Ukraine
Ninth convocation members of the Verkhovna Rada
Crimean Tatar activists
Grand Crosses of the Order of Merit of the Republic of Poland
Crimean Tatar politicians
Laureates of the Honorary Diploma of the Verkhovna Rada of Ukraine
Recipients of the Honorary Diploma of the Cabinet of Ministers of Ukraine
Nansen Refugee Award laureates